The 1952 Roller Hockey World Cup was the eighth roller hockey world cup, organized by the Fédération Internationale de Patinage a Roulettes (now under the name of Fédération Internationale de Roller Sports). It was contested by 10 national teams (9 from Europe and 1 from Africa) and it is also considered the 1952 European Roller Hockey Championship (despite the presence of Egypt). All the games were played in the city of Porto, in Portugal, the chosen city to host the World Cup.

Results

Standings

Final

See also
FIRS Roller Hockey World Cup
CERH European Roller Hockey Championship

External links
1952 World Cup in rink-hockey.net historical database

Roller Hockey World Cup
International roller hockey competitions hosted by Portugal
1952 in Portuguese sport
1952 in roller hockey